Bridges Not Walls is an extended play by singer-songwriter Billy Bragg, compiling six songs released as downloads as a physical CD in 2017. It was released as  a Mini-LP on November 3, 2017, and includes the new song "Full English Brexit". It was described in Record Collector as "a solid gold illustration of an always inspiring singer-songwriter finding inspiration in the actions of others."

Track listing 
All tracks composed by Billy Bragg, with the exception of track 3 which was written by Anaïs Mitchell and appeared on her album Hadestown.

Personnel
Billy Bragg — vocals, electric guitar, acoustic guitar, bass
CJ Hillman — electric guitar, pedal steel, mandolin, backing vocals
Simon Edwards — double bass, backing vocals
Jacob Stoney — piano, organ, Mellotron, keyboards, backing vocals
Fred Claridge — drums, backing vocals, cajon
Judith Goodman — Mellotron
May Fitzpatrick — backing vocals
Dave Ross — drums

References

2017 EPs
Billy Bragg albums
Albums produced by Joe Henry
Cooking Vinyl EPs
Politics in popular culture